Narcissus bujei is a species of the genus Narcissus (daffodils) in the family Amaryllidaceae. It is classified in Section Nevadensis. The flower is a plain yellow. It is native to the Andalusia region of Spain, in particular the Comarca of Subbética (Córdoba) and the Sierra de las Nieves in the Serranía de Ronda (Málaga). It is considered an endangered species. Its preferred habitat is calcareous soils in small forests and irrigated land.

Taxonomy 
Narcissus bujei has had a chequered history. It is considered an ancient hybrid of N. pseudonarcissus where they overlap with species from Nevadensis. It was first described as N. longispathus var. bujei Fern. Casas, then as a variety of N. hispanicus, then a subspecies of N. hispanicus and then as a separate species, all by Fernandez Casas at various times. Although still listed as a synonym of N. longispathus on the World Checklist, its species rank was confirmed by Zonneveld on the basis of DNA content (30 vs. 36 pg) and included in the new Section Nevadensis, distinct from Pseudonarcissus, being from southern Spain with a DNA content of 30–39 pg.

An alternative spelling of N. bugei is accepted.

References

Bibliography 

Narcissus bujei  Tropicos
Narcissus bujei  Plant List

bujei
Garden plants
Endemic flora of Spain
Endemic flora of the Iberian Peninsula